Dolby Surround 7.1 (sometimes called Dolby 7.1 surround sound) is a sound system by Dolby Laboratories which delivers theatrical 7.1 surround sound to movie-goers. It is the most recent addition to a family of audio compression technologies developed by Dolby known as Dolby Digital.

It adds two new channels to current Dolby Digital 5.1. The first film to feature Dolby Surround 7.1 was 2010's Toy Story 3 by Walt Disney Pictures and Pixar.

See also
 Dolby Digital
 7.1 surround sound

References

External links
 Dolby 7.1 webpage 
Movies Released Presented in 7.1 

Surround sound
Film sound production
Dolby Laboratories
Audiovisual introductions in 2010
American brands